W27DH-D, virtual and UHF digital channel 27, is a now-defunct low-powered Azteca America-affiliated television station licensed to Evansville, Indiana, United States. The station was owned by HC2 Holdings.

History 
The station's construction permit was issued on September 28, 2010. It was briefly on air and then, on December 16, 2020, the FCC, at the request of DTV America, cancelled the license of the station. The license of sister station WUCU-LD (channel 33) was cancelled at the same time.

Digital channels
The station's digital signal was multiplexed:

References

External links

Low-power television stations in the United States
Innovate Corp.
Television stations in Indiana
Television channels and stations established in 2016
2016 establishments in Indiana
Defunct television stations in the United States
Television channels and stations disestablished in 2020
2020 disestablishments in Indiana